The Green Knight is a figure in Arthurian romance.

Green Knight or The Green Knight may also refer to:

Arts and literature
The Green Knight (fairy tale), a Danish fairy tale
 The Green Knight (film), a 2021 film adaptation of Sir Gawain and the Green Knight
The Green Knight (novel), a 1993 novel by Iris Murdoch
The Greene Knight, a late medieval romance that tells the same story as Sir Gawain and the Green Knight
Green Knight Publishing, a publishing company

Other uses
Green Knight, or Knight of Kerry, an Anglo-Irish hereditary knighthood
"Green Knight", a 2009 song by Memory Tapes from the album Seek Magic
 The Green Knight, a King Arthur class railway locomotive
 The Green Knights, nickname of VMFA-121, a United States Marine Corps aircraft squadron

See also
Sir Gawain and the Green Knight, a late 14th-century Middle English chivalric romance.